This is a list of the species of the genus Aloe. , the World Checklist of Selected Plant Families accepts about 580 species and hybrids.

A

 Aloe aaata T.A.McCoy & Lavranos – Saudi Arabia
 Aloe aageodonta L.E.Newton – Kenya (Kitui Distr.)
 Aloe abyssicola Lavranos & Bilaidi – S. Yemen (Jabal Al-Arays)
 Aloe aculeata Pole-Evans – S. Zimbabwe to Limpopo
 Aloe acutissima H.Perrier – Madagascar
 Aloe adigratana Reynolds – Eritrea to N. Ethiopia
 Aloe affinis A.Berger – Mpumalanga
 Aloe africana Mill. – S. Cape Province
 Aloe ahmarensis Favell, M.B.Mill. & Al-Gifri – S. Yemen
 Aloe alaotrensis J.-P.Castillon
 Aloe albida (Stapf) Reynolds – Mpumalanga to Swaziland
 Aloe albiflora Guillaumin – S. Madagascar
 Aloe albostriata T.A.McCoy, Rakouth & Lavranos – Central Madagascar
 Aloe albovestita S.Carter & Brandham – Djibouti to N. Somalia
 Aloe aldabrensis (Marais) L.E.Newton & G.D.Rowley – Aldabra
 Aloe alexandrei Ellert – Comoros (W. Grand Comore)
 Aloe alfredii Rauh – Central Madagascar
 Aloe alooides (Bolus) Druten – Mpumalanga
 Aloe ambigens Chiov. – Central Somalia
 Aloe ambositrae J.-P.Castillon – E. Central Madagascar
 Aloe ambrensis J.-B.Castillon – N. Madagascar
 Aloe amicorum L.E.Newton – N. Kenya (Mt. Kulal)
 Aloe ammophila Reynolds – Limpopo
 Aloe ampefyana J.-B.Castillon – N. Central Madagascar (near Ampefy)
 Aloe amudatensis Reynolds – Burundi to N.W. Kenya
 Aloe analavelonensis Letsara, Rakotoar. & Almeda – Madagascar
 Aloe andersonii van Jaarsv. & P.Nel – Mpumalanga
 Aloe andongensis Baker – Angola
 Aloe andringitrensis H.Perrier – S. Central Madagascar
 Aloe angelica Pole-Evans – Limpopo
 Aloe anivoranoensis (Rauh & Hebding) L.E.Newton & G.D.Rowley – N.E. Madagascar
 Aloe ankaranensis Rauh & Mangelsdorff – N.W. Madagascar
 Aloe ankoberensis M.G.Gilbert & Sebsebe – Ethiopia (Shewa Reg.)
 Aloe anodonta T.A.McCoy & Lavranos – Somalia
 Aloe ×  anosyana J.-P.Castillon – Madagascar
 Aloe antandroi (Decary) H.Perrier – S.W. & S. Madagascar
 Aloe antoetrana J.-B.Castillon – Madagascar
 Aloe antonii J.-B.Castillon – W. Madagascar
 Aloe antsingyensis (Leandri) L.E.Newton & G.D.Rowley – W. Madagascar
 Aloe arborescens Mill. – S. Tropical & S. Africa
 Aloe archeri Lavranos – Kenya
 Aloe arenicola Reynolds – W. & WS.W. Cape Province
 Aloe argenticauda Merxm. & Giess – Namibia
 Aloe argentifolia T.A.McCoy, Rulkens & O.J.Baptista – Mozambique
 Aloe argyrostachys Lavranos, Rakouth & T.A.McCoy – Central Madagascar
 Aloe armatissima Lavranos & Collen. – W. Saudi Arabia
 Aloe arneodoi Rebmann – Madagascar
 Aloe asperifolia A.Berger – W. Namibia
 Aloe aufensis T.A.McCoy – W. Saudi Arabia (Jabal Auf)
 Aloe aurelienii J.-B.Castillon – E. Madagascar
 Aloe austroarabica T.A.McCoy & Lavranos – S.W. Arabian Peninsula
 Aloe austrosudanica T.A.McCoy – South Sudan

B

 Aloe babatiensis Christian & I.Verd. – N. Tanzania
 Aloe bakeri Scott Elliot – S.E. Madagascar
 Aloe ballii Reynolds – S. Tropical Africa (Chimanimani Mts.)

 Aloe ballyi Reynolds – S.E. Kenya to N.E. Tanzania
 Aloe barbara-jeppeae T.A.McCoy & Lavranos – Mpumalanga
 Aloe bargalensis Lavranos – N. & N.E. Somalia
 Aloe beankaensis Letsara, Rakotoar. & Almeda – Madagascar
 Aloe belavenokensis (Rauh & Gerold) L.E.Newton & G.D.Rowley – S.E. Madagascar
 Aloe bella G.D.Rowley – N. Somalia
 Aloe bellatula Reynolds – Central Madagascar (Mt. Ambatomenaloha)
 Aloe benishangulana Sebsebe & Tesfaye – Ethiopia
 Aloe berevoana Lavranos – W. Madagascar
 Aloe bergeriana (Dinter) Boatwr. & J.C.Manning – Zimbabwe to S. Africa
 Aloe bernadettae J.-B.Castillon – S.E. Madagascar
 Aloe bernardii J.-P.Castillon – Madagascar
 Aloe bertemariae Sebsebe & Dioli – E. Ethiopia
 Aloe betsileensis H.Perrier – S. Central Madagascar
 Aloe bicomitum L.C.Leach – S.W. Tanzania to N.E. Zambia
 Aloe boiteaui Guillaumin – S.E. Madagascar
 Aloe boscawenii Christian – N.E. Tanzania
 Aloe bosseri J.-B.Castillon – W. Madagascar
 Aloe bowiea Schult. & Schult.f. – S. Cape Province
 Aloe boylei Baker – S. Africa
 Aloe braamvanwykii Gideon F.Sm. & Figueiredo – North-West Province
 Aloe brachystachys Baker – S.E. Tanzania
 Aloe branddraaiensis Groenew. – Mpumalanga
 Aloe brandhamii S.Carter – S.W. Tanzania
 Aloe brevifolia Mill. – S.W. Cape Province
 Aloe breviscapa Reynolds & P.R.O.Bally – N. Somalia
 Aloe broomii Schönland – S. Africa
 Aloe brunneodentata Lavranos & Collen. – E. Saudi Arabia
 Aloe brunneostriata Lavranos & S.Carter – N.E. Somalia
 Aloe bruynsii P.I.Forst. – S.E. Madagascar
 Aloe buchananii Baker – S. Malawi
 Aloe buchlohii Rauh – S.E. Madagascar
 Aloe buettneri A.Berger – W. Tropical Africa to Chad and N.W. Namibia
 Aloe buhrii Lavranos – W. Cape Province
 Aloe bukobana Reynolds – S. Uganda to Burundi and W. Tanzania
 Aloe bulbicaulis Christian – S.W. Tanzania to S. Tropical Africa
 Aloe bulbillifera H.Perrier – Madagascar
 Aloe bullockii Reynolds – Tanzania (Kahama Distr.)
 Aloe burgersfortensis Reynolds – Mpumalanga
 Aloe bussei A.Berger – E. Tanzania
 Aloe butiabana T.C.Cole & T.G.Forrest – Uganda
 Aloe ×  buzairiensis Lodé – Socotra

C

 Aloe ×  caesia Salm-Dyck – Cape Province
 Aloe calcairophila Reynolds – Central Madagascar
 Aloe calidophila Reynolds – S. Ethiopia to N. Kenya
 Aloe calliantha T.A.McCoy & Lavranos – Saudi Arabia
 Aloe cameronii Hemsl. – S. Tropical Africa
 Aloe camperi Schweinf. – N.E. Sudan to N. Ethiopia
 Aloe canarina S.Carter – E. South Sudan to N. Uganda
 Aloe candelabrum A.Berger – S. KwaZulu-Natal
 Aloe canis S.Lane – S. Malawi (Senga Hills)
 Aloe cannellii L.C.Leach – W. Mozambique
 Aloe capitata Baker – Madagascar
 Aloe capmanambatoensis Rauh & Gerold – N. Madagascar
 Aloe carnea S.Carter – E. Zimbabwe to W. Mozambique
 Aloe carolineae L.E.Newton – N.E. Kenya
 Aloe castanea Schönland – Gauteng to Swaziland
 Aloe castellorum J.R.I.Wood – S.W. Arabian Peninsula
 Aloe castilloniae J.-B.Castillon – S. Madagascar
 Aloe cataractarum T.A.McCoy & Lavranos – S.W. Tanzania
 Aloe catengiana Reynolds – W. Angola to N.W. Namibia
 Aloe chabaudii Schönland – S. Tanzania to S. Africa
 Aloe challisii van Jaarsv. & A.E.van Wyk – Mpumalanga
 Aloe charlotteae J.-B.Castillon – S. Central Madagascar
 Aloe cheranganiensis S.Carter & Brandham – N. Uganda to N.W. Kenya
 Aloe chlorantha Lavranos – Northern Cape Province
 Aloe chortolirioides A.Berger – Limpopo to Swaziland
 Aloe christianii Reynolds – S. Tanzania to S. Africa
 Aloe chrysostachys Lavranos & L.E.Newton – E. Kenya
 Aloe cipolinicola (H.Perrier) J.-B.Castillon & J.-P.Castillon – Central Madagascar
 Aloe citrea (Guillaumin) L.E.Newton & G.D.Rowley – S.E. Madagascar
 Aloe citrina S.Carter & Brandham – S.E. Ethiopia to N.E. Kenya
 Aloe clarkei L.E.Newton – S.W. Ethiopia (Mt. Naita)
 Aloe classenii Reynolds – S.E. Kenya
 Aloe claviflora Burch. – S. Africa
 Aloe collenetteae Lavranos – S. Oman
 Aloe collina S.Carter – E. Zimbabwe (Nyanga Mts.)
 Aloe ×  commutata Tod. – S. Africa
 Aloe comosa Marloth & A.Berger – S.W. Cape Province
 Aloe compressa H.Perrier – Madagascar
 Aloe comptonii Reynolds – S. Cape Province
 Aloe condyae van Jaarsv. & P.Nel – Mpumalanga
 Aloe confusa Engl. – S.E. Kenya to N.E. Tanzania
 Aloe congdonii S.Carter – S.W. Tanzania
 Aloe conifera H.Perrier – Madagascar
 Aloe cooperi Baker – Mozambique to KwaZulu-Natal
 Aloe corallina I.Verd. – S. Angola to N. Namibia
 Aloe craibii Gideon F.Sm. – Mpumalanga
 Aloe crassipes Baker – S.W. South Sudan
 Aloe cremnophila Reynolds & P.R.O.Bally – N. Somalia
 Aloe cryptoflora Reynolds – E. Central Madagascar
 Aloe cryptopoda Baker – S.E. Tanzania to Botswana
 Aloe cyrtophylla Lavranos – Central Madagascar

D

 Aloe dabenorisana van Jaarsv. – Cape Province
 Aloe darainensis J.-P.Castillon – N. Madagascar
 Aloe dawei A.Berger – N.E. DR Congo to W. Kenya
 Aloe debrana Christian – Central Ethiopia
 Aloe decaryi Guillaumin – S. Madagascar
 Aloe decorsei H.Perrier – S. Central Madagascar (Massif de l' Andringitra)
 Aloe decurva Reynolds – Mozambique (Mt. Zembe)
 Aloe deinacantha T.A.McCoy, Rakouth & Lavranos – W. Madagascar
 Aloe delicatifolia J.-B.Castillon – Madagascar
 Aloe delphinensis Rauh – S.E. Madagascar
 Aloe deltoideodonta Baker – Madagascar
 Aloe descoingsii Reynolds – S. Madagascar
 Aloe deserti A.Berger – S. Kenya to N.E. Tanzania
 Aloe dewetii Reynolds – S.E. Mpumalanga to N. KwaZulu-Natal
 Aloe dewinteri Giess ex Borman & Hardy – N.W. Namibia
 Aloe dhufarensis Lavranos – S.E. Yemen to S. Oman
 Aloe diolii L.E.Newton – South Sudan (Mt. Lorienetom)
 Aloe distans Haw. – S.W. Cape Province
 Aloe divaricata A.Berger – Madagascar
 Aloe djiboutiensis T.A.McCoy – Eritrea to Djibouti
 Aloe doddsiorum T.A.McCoy & Lavranos – Kenya (Samburu Distr.)
 Aloe dominella Reynolds – KwaZulu-Natal to Swaziland
 Aloe dorotheae A.Berger – N.E. Tanzania
 Aloe downsiana T.A.McCoy & Lavranos – E. Ethiopia
 Aloe droseroides Lavranos & T.A.McCoy – Central Madagascar
 Aloe duckeri Christian – S.W. Tanzania to N. Zambia
 Aloe dyeri Schönland – Mpumalanga to W. Swaziland

E

 Aloe ecklonis Salm-Dyck – S. Africa
 Aloe edouardii Rebmann – E. Central Madagascar
 Aloe elata S.Carter & L.E.Newton – S. Kenya to N. Tanzania
 Aloe elegans Tod. – W. Sudan, Eritrea to Central Ethiopia
 Aloe elegantissima T.A.McCoy & Lavranos – N. Somalia
 Aloe elgonica Bullock – Kenya (Mt. Elgon)
 Aloe elkerriana Dioli & T.A.McCoy – Ethiopia (Bale Reg.)
 Aloe ellenbeckii A.Berger – S. Ethiopia to N. Kenya
 Aloe eremophila Lavranos – S. Yemen
 Aloe erensii Christian – S.E. South Sudan to N.W. Kenya
 Aloe ericahenriettae T.A.McCoy – Djibouti
 Aloe ericetorum Bosser – N. Central Madagascar
 Aloe erinacea D.S.Hardy – S.W. Namibia
 Aloe erythrophylla Bosser – Central Madagascar
 Aloe esculenta L.C.Leach – S.W. Zambia to N. Namibia
 Aloe eumassawana S.Carter, M.G.Gilbert & Sebsebe – Eritrea to Djibouti
 Aloe excelsa A.Berger – S. Tropical Africa to Limpopo
 Aloe eximia Lavranos & T.A.McCoy – Central Madagascar

F

 Aloe falcata Baker – W. Cape Province
 Aloe ferox Mill. – Cape Province to Lesotho
 Aloe fibrosa Lavranos & L.E.Newton – Kenya to N. Tanzania
 Aloe fievetii Reynolds – E. Central Madagascar
 Aloe fimbrialis S.Carter – N.W. Zambia (Barotseland)
 Aloe fleurentiniorum Lavranos & L.E.Newton – S.W. Arabian Peninsula
 Aloe fleuretteana Rauh & Gerold – S. Madagascar
 Aloe flexilifolia Christian – N.E. Tanzania (W. Usambara Mts.)
 Aloe florenceae Lavranos & T.A.McCoy – Central Madagascar
 Aloe forbesii Balf.f. – Socotra (Central Hajhir Mts.)
 Aloe fosteri Pillans – Mpumalanga
 Aloe fouriei D.S.Hardy & Glen – Mpumalanga
 Aloe fragilis Lavranos & Röösli – N. Madagascar
 Aloe francombei L.E.Newton – Kenya (Laikipia Distr.)
 Aloe friisii Sebsebe & M.G.Gilbert – S.W. Ethiopia
 Aloe fulleri Lavranos – S. Yemen

G

 Aloe gariepensis Pillans – S.W. Namibia to N.W. Cape Province
 Aloe gautieri J.-P.Castillon & Nusb. – Madagascar
 Aloe gerstneri Reynolds – N. KwaZulu-Natal
 Aloe ghibensis Sebsebe & Friis – Ethiopia
 Aloe gilbertii T.Reynolds ex Sebsebe & Brandham – Ethiopia
 Aloe gillettii S.Carter – N.E. Somalia
 Aloe glabrescens (Reynolds & P.R.O.Bally) S.Carter & Brandham – N. Somalia
 Aloe glauca Mill. – W. & S.W. Cape Province
 Aloe globuligemma Pole-Evans – Zimbabwe to Mpumalanga
 Aloe gneissicola (H.Perrier) J.-B.Castillon & J.-P.Castillon – W. Madagascar
 Aloe gossweileri Reynolds – W. Angola
 Aloe gracilicaulis Reynolds & P.R.O.Bally – N. Somalia
 Aloe graciliflora Groenew. – Mpumalanga
 Aloe grandidentata Salm-Dyck – S. Africa
 Aloe graniticola Rebmann – Madagascar
 Aloe grata Reynolds – Angola (Chimbango Hill)
 Aloe greatheadii Schönland – S. DR Congo to S. Africa
 Aloe greenii Green – N.E. KwaZulu-Natal to Mozambique
 Aloe grisea S.Carter & Brandham – Djibouti to N. Somalia
 Aloe guerrae Reynolds – W. Central Angola
 Aloe guillaumetii Cremers – N. Madagascar

H

 Aloe haggeherensis T.A.McCoy & Lavranos – Socotra (Hajhir Mts.)
 Aloe hahnii Gideon F.Sm. & Klopper – Limpopo
 Aloe hardyi Glen – Mpumalanga (near Origstad)
 Aloe harlana Reynolds – E. Ethiopia
 Aloe haroniensis T.A.McCoy, Plowes & O.J.Baptista – Zimbabwe
 Aloe haworthioides Baker – Madagascar
 Aloe hazeliana Reynolds – S. Tropical Africa (Chimanimani Mts.)
 Aloe helenae Danguy – S.E. Madagascar
 Aloe heliderana Lavranos – N. Somalia
 Aloe hemmingii Reynolds & P.R.O.Bally – N.W. Somalia
 Aloe hendrickxii Reynolds – E. DR Congo
 Aloe hereroensis Engl. – Angola to S. Africa
 Aloe heybensis Lavranos – S. Somalia
 Aloe ×  hexapetala Salm-Dyck – S. Cape Province
 Aloe hildebrandtii Baker – N. Somalia
 Aloe hlangapies Groenew. – Mpumalanga to KwaZulu-Natal
 Aloe hoffmannii Lavranos – Central Madagascar
 Aloe humbertii H.Perrier – S.E. Madagascar
 Aloe humilis (L.) Mill. – S. Cape Province
 Aloe huntleyana van Jaarsv. & Swanepoel – N.W. Namibia

I

 Aloe ibitiensis H.Perrier – Central Madagascar
 Aloe ifanadianae J.-B.Castillon – E. Madagascar
 Aloe ikiorum Dioli & G.Powys – Uganda
 Aloe imalotensis Reynolds – S. Central & S.E. Madagascar
 Aloe ×  imerinensis Bosser – Central Madagascar
 Aloe immaculata Pillans – Limpopo
 Aloe inamara L.C.Leach – W. Angola
 Aloe inconspicua Plowes – KwaZulu-Natal
 Aloe inermis Forssk. – S. Saudi Arabia to W. Oman
 Aloe inexpectata Lavranos & T.A.McCoy – Central Madagascar
 Aloe integra Reynolds – Mpumalanga to Swaziland
 Aloe inyangensis Christian – Zimbabwe
 Aloe irafensis Lavranos, T.A.McCoy & Al-Gifri – Yemen (Jabal Iraf)
 Aloe isaloensis H.Perrier – S. Central Madagascar
 Aloe ithya T.A.McCoy & L.E.Newton – South Sudan (Imatong Mts.)
 Aloe ivakoanyensis Letsara, Rakotoar. & Almeda – Madagascar

J

 Aloe jacksonii Reynolds – E. Ethiopia to Somalia
 Aloe jawiyon S.J.Christie, D.P.Hannon & Oakman ex A.G.Mill. – Socotra
 Aloe jeppeae Klopper & Gideon F.Sm. – Free State to Gauteng
 Aloe jibisana L.E.Newton – N. Kenya
 Aloe johannis J.-B.Castillon – Central Madagascar
 Aloe johannis-bernardii J.-P.Castillon – N. Madagascar
 Aloe johannis-philippei J.-B.Castillon – S. Central Madagascar
 Aloe jucunda Reynolds – N. Somalia
 Aloe juvenna Brandham & S.Carter – S.W. Kenya to N. Tanzania

K

 Aloe kahinii T.A.McCoy & Lavranos – N. Somalia
 Aloe kamnelii van Jaarsv. – Western Cape Province
 Aloe kaokoensis van Jaarsv., Swanepoel & A.E.van Wyk – N. Namibia (Otjihips Mts.)
 Aloe karasbergensis Pillans – Namibia to N.W. Cape Province
 Aloe ×  keayi Reynolds – Ghana
 Aloe kedongensis Reynolds – S.W. Kenya
 Aloe kefaensis M.G.Gilbert & Sebsebe – S. Ethiopia
 Aloe ketabrowniorum L.E.Newton – N. Kenya
 Aloe khamiesensis Pillans – W. Cape Province
 Aloe kilifiensis Christian – S.E. Kenya to N.E. Tanzania
 Aloe knersvlakensis S.J.Marais – Western Cape Province
 Aloe kniphofioides Baker – S. Africa
 Aloe koenenii Lavranos & Kerstin Koch – Jordan to W. Saudi Arabia
 Aloe komaggasensis Kritz. & Jaarsveld – N.W. Cape Province
 Aloe komatiensis Reynolds – E. Mpumalanga to S. Mozambique
 Aloe kouebokkeveldensis van Jaarsv. & A.B.Low – S.W. Cape Province
 Aloe krapohliana Marloth – N.W. Cape Province
 Aloe kraussii Baker – S. Central KwaZulu-Natal
 Aloe kulalensis L.E.Newton & Beentje – N. Kenya (Mt. Kulal)
 Aloe kwasimbana T.A.McCoy & Lavranos – N. Tanzania (Lossogoni Plateau)

L

 Aloe labworana (Reynolds) S.Carter – South Sudan to N. Uganda
 Aloe laeta A.Berger – Madagascar
 Aloe lanata T.A.McCoy & Lavranos – N. Yemen
 Aloe latens T.A.McCoy & Lavranos – Tanzania (Arusha Distr.)
 Aloe lateritia Engl. – S. Ethiopia to N. Malawi
 Aloe lavranosii Reynolds – S. Yemen
 Aloe leachii Reynolds – Tanzania (Morogoro Distr.)
 Aloe leandrii Bosser – CE. Madagascar
 Aloe leedalii S.Carter – S.W. Tanzania
 Aloe lensayuensis Lavranos & L.E.Newton – N. Kenya
 Aloe lepida L.C.Leach – Angola (Huambo)
 Aloe leptosiphon A.Berger – N.E. Tanzania
 Aloe lettyae Reynolds – Limpopo
 Aloe liliputana van Jaarsv. & Harrower – Eastern Cape Province
 Aloe lindenii Lavranos – N. Somalia
 Aloe linearifolia A.Berger – Mpumalanga to E. Cape Province
 Aloe lineata (Aiton) Haw. – Cape Province
 Aloe littoralis Baker – S. Tropical Africa to Namibia
 Aloe lolwensis L.E.Newton – S.E. Uganda to Kenya (Islands in Lake Victoria)
 Aloe lomatophylloides Balf.f. – Rodrigues
 Aloe longibracteata Pole-Evans – Limpopo to Mpumalanga
 Aloe longistyla Baker – Cape Province
 Aloe luapulana L.C.Leach – N. Zambia
 Aloe lucile-allorgeae Rauh – S.E. Madagascar
 Aloe lukeana T.C.Cole – South Sudan to Uganda
 Aloe luntii Baker – N. Somalia, S.E. Yemen to S. Oman
 Aloe lutescens Groenew. – S. Zimbabwe to Limpopo

M
 Aloe macleayi Reynolds – South Sudan (Imatong Mts.) to N. Uganda
 Aloe macra Haw. – Réunion
 Aloe macrocarpa Tod. – Mali to Djibouti
 Aloe macroclada Baker – S. Central Madagascar
 Aloe macrosiphon Baker – Rwanda to E. Tropical Africa
 Aloe maculata All. – S. Africa
 Aloe mahraensis Lavranos & T.A.McCoy – S. Yemen
 Aloe manandonae J.-B.Castillon & J.-P.Castillon – Central Madagascar
 Aloe mandotoensis J.-B.Castillon – W. Madagascar
 Aloe mandrarensis J.-P.Castillon – Madagascar
 Aloe mangeaensis L.E.Newton & S.Carter
 Aloe maningoryensis J.-P.Castillon
 Aloe marlothii A.Berger – S.E. Botswana to KwaZulu-Natal
 Aloe martialii J.-B.Castillon – Madagascar
 Aloe massawana Reynolds – Kenya to Mozambique, N. Madagascar
 Aloe mawii Christian – S.E. Tanzania to N. Mozambique
 Aloe mayottensis A.Berger – Comoros (Mayotte)
 Aloe mccoyi Lavranos & Mies – S. Yemen (Fartaq Mts.)
 Aloe mcloughlinii Christian – E. Ethiopia to Djibouti
 Aloe medishiana Reynolds & P.R.O.Bally – N. Somalia
 Aloe megalacantha Baker – Ethiopia to N. Somalia
 Aloe megalocarpa Lavranos – N. Madagascar
 Aloe melanacantha A.Berger – W. Cape Province
 Aloe ×  menachensis (Schweinf.) Blatt. – Yemen (Jabal Haraz)
 Aloe mendesii Reynolds – S.W. Angola (Serra da Chela)
 Aloe menyharthii Baker – S. Malawi to Mozambique
 Aloe metallica Engl. & Gilg – S. Central Angola
 Aloe meyeri van Jaarsv. – W. Cape Province
 Aloe micracantha Haw. – S.E. Cape Province to KwaZulu-Natal
 Aloe microdonta Chiov. – Somalia to E. Kenya
 Aloe microstigma Salm-Dyck – Namibia to Cape Province
 Aloe millotii Reynolds – S. Madagascar
 Aloe milne-redheadii Christian – E. Angola to N.W. Zambia
 Aloe minima Baker – S. Africa
 Aloe miskatana S.Carter – N.E. Somalia
 Aloe mitsioana J.-B.Castillon – N. Madagascar
 Aloe mocamedensis van Jaarsv. – Angola
 Aloe modesta Reynolds – Mpumalanga to KwaZulu-Natal
 Aloe molederana Lavranos & Glen – N. Somalia
 Aloe monotropa I.Verd. – Limpopo
 Aloe monticola Reynolds – N.E. Ethiopia
 Aloe montis-nabro Orlando & El Azzouni – Eritrea
 Aloe morijensis S.Carter & Brandham – S. Kenya to N. Tanzania
 Aloe mossurilensis Ellert – Mozambique
 Aloe mottramiana J.-B.Castillon – Madagascar
 Aloe mubendiensis Christian – W. Uganda
 Aloe mudenensis Reynolds – N. KwaZulu-Natal to Swaziland
 Aloe multicolor L.E.Newton – N. Kenya
 Aloe munchii Christian – S. Tropical Africa (Chimanimani Mts.)
 Aloe murina L.E.Newton – Kenya (Masai Distr.)
 Aloe musapana Reynolds – Zimbabwe (N.W. Chimanimani Mts.)
 Aloe mutabilis Pillans – Limpopo
 Aloe myriacantha (Haw.) Schult. & Schult.f. – Uganda to S. Africa
 Aloe mzimbana I.Verd. & Christian – S.W. Tanzania to N. Zambia

N-O

 Aloe namibensis Giess – Namibia
 Aloe namorokaensis (Rauh) L.E.Newton & G.D.Rowley – W. Madagascar
 Aloe neilcrouchii Klopper & Gideon F.Sm. – KwaZulu-Natal
 Aloe neoqaharensis T.A.McCoy – Saudi Arabia (Jabal Qahar)
 Aloe neosteudneri Lavranos & T.A.McCoy – Eritrea (Jebel Saber)
 Aloe newtonii J.-B.Castillon – S. Central Madagascar
 Aloe ngobitensis Reynolds – S. Kenya to N. Tanzania
 Aloe ngongensis Christian – Kenya to N.E. Tanzania
 Aloe nicholsii Gideon F.Sm. & N.R.Crouch – KwaZulu-Natal
 Aloe niebuhriana Lavranos – S.W. Yemen
 Aloe niensiensis L.E.Newton – Tanzania
 Aloe nigrimontana T.A.McCoy & Lavranos – Somalia
 Aloe nordaliae Wabuyele – Tanzania
 Aloe nubigena Groenew. – Mpumalanga
 Aloe nugalensis Thulin – Somalia
 Aloe nuttii Baker – Tanzania to Angola
 Aloe nyeriensis Christian & I.Verd. – Central Kenya
 Aloe occidentalis (H.Perrier) L.E.Newton & G.D.Rowley – W. Madagascar
 Aloe officinalis Forssk. – S.W. Arabian Peninsula
 Aloe oligophylla Baker – N. Central Madagascar
 Aloe omavandae van Jaarsv. – Namibia (E. Baynes Mts.)
 Aloe omoana T.A.McCoy & Lavranos – Central Ethiopia
 Aloe orientalis (H.Perrier) L.E.Newton & G.D.Rowley – E. Madagascar
 Aloe orlandi Lavranos – N.W. Somalia
 Aloe ortholopha Christian & Milne-Red. – Zimbabwe (Mvurwi Range)
 Aloe otallensis Baker – S. Ethiopia

P

 Aloe pachydactylos T.A.McCoy & Lavranos – Central Madagascar
 Aloe pachygaster Dinter – Namibia
 Aloe paedogona A.Berger – Angola to N. Namibia
 Aloe palmiformis Baker – S.W. Angola
 Aloe parallelifolia H.Perrier – Central Madagascar
 Aloe parvibracteata Schönland – Mozambique to S. Africa
 Aloe parvicapsula Lavranos & Collen. – Saudi Arabia (Jebel Fayfah)
 Aloe parvidens M.G.Gilbert & Sebsebe – S. Ethiopia to N.E. Tanzania
 Aloe parviflora Baker – S. Central KwaZulu-Natal
 Aloe parvula A.Berger – Central Madagascar
 Aloe patersonii B.Mathew – S. DR Congo
 Aloe pavelkae van Jaarsv., Swanepoel, A.E.van Wyk & Lavranos – S.W. Namibia
 Aloe pearsonii Schönland – S.W. Namibia to W. Cape Province
 Aloe peckii P.R.O.Bally & I.Verd. – N. Somalia
 Aloe peglerae Schönland – North-West Province to Gauteng
 Aloe pembana L.E.Newton – Tanzania (Pemba, Misali I.)
 Aloe pendens Forssk. – W. Yemen
 Aloe penduliflora Baker – S.E. Kenya
 Aloe percrassa Tod. – Eritrea to N.E. Ethiopia
 Aloe perdita Ellert – Zimbabwe
 Aloe perfoliata L. – S.W. & S. Cape Province
 Aloe perrieri Reynolds – S. Central Madagascar
 Aloe perryi Baker – Socotra
 Aloe petricola Pole-Evans – Mpumalanga
 Aloe petrophila Pillans – Limpopo
 Aloe peyrierasii Cremers – N. Madagascar
 Aloe ×  philippei J.-B.Castillon – S. Madagascar
 Aloe pictifolia D.S.Hardy – E. Cape Province
 Aloe pienaarii Pole-Evans – Mozambiqe to S. Mozambique
 Aloe pirottae A.Berger – S. & E. Ethiopia to N.E. Kenya
 Aloe plowesii Reynolds – S. Tropical Africa (Chimanimani Mts.)
 Aloe pluridens Haw. – E. Cape Province to KwaZulu-Natal
 Aloe polyphylla Pillans – Lesotho (Maluti Mts.)
 Aloe porphyrostachys Lavranos & Collen. – S.W. Saudi Arabia (Jabal Radhwa)
 Aloe powysiorum L.E.Newton & Beentje – N. Kenya
 Aloe praetermissa T.A.McCoy & Lavranos – S. Oman
 Aloe pratensis Baker – E. Cape Province to KwaZulu-Natal
 Aloe pretoriensis Pole-Evans – Zimbabwe to Swaziland
 Aloe prinslooi I.Verd. & D.S.Hardy – Central KwaZulu-Natal
 Aloe procera L.C.Leach – W. Central Angola (Cuanza Sul)
 Aloe pronkii Lavranos, Rakouth & T.A.McCoy – Central Madagascar
 Aloe propagulifera (Rauh & Razaf.) L.E.Newton & G.D.Rowley – Central Madagascar
 Aloe prostrata (H.Perrier) L.E.Newton & G.D.Rowley – W. Madagascar
 Aloe pruinosa Reynolds – KwaZulu-Natal
 Aloe pseudoparvula J.-B.Castillon – Central Madagascar
 Aloe pseudorubroviolacea Lavranos & Collen. – W. Saudi Arabia
 Aloe ×  puberula (Schweinf.) A.Berger – Ethiopia
 Aloe pubescens Reynolds – Ethiopia (Arussi Province)
 Aloe pulcherrima M.G.Gilbert & Sebsebe – Ethiopia (Shewa Reg.)
 Aloe purpurea Lam. – Mauritius
 Aloe pustuligemma L.E.Newton – N. Kenya

R

 Aloe rabaiensis Rendle – S. Somalia to N. Tanzania
 Aloe rapanarivoi J.-P.Castillon – Madagascar
 Aloe rauhii Reynolds – S. Madagascar
 Aloe rebmannii Lavranos – S.E. Madagascar
 Aloe reitzii Reynolds – S. Africa
 Aloe rendilliorum L.E.Newton – Kenya (Marsabit Distr.)
 Aloe retrospiciens Reynolds & P.R.O.Bally – E. Ethiopia to Somalia
 Aloe reynoldsii Letty – E. Cape Province
 Aloe rhodesiana Rendle – S. Tropical Africa (Chimanimani Mts.)
 Aloe ribauensis T.A.McCoy, Rulkens & O.J.Baptista – Mozambique
 Aloe richardsiae Reynolds – S.W. Tanzania
 Aloe richaudii Rebmann – N. Madagascar
 Aloe rigens Reynolds & P.R.O.Bally – Djibouti to N. Somalia
 Aloe rivae Baker – S. Ethiopia to N. Kenya
 Aloe rivierei Lavranos & L.E.Newton – S.W. Arabian Peninsula
 Aloe rodolphei J.-B.Castillon – N. Madagascar
 Aloe roeoeslii Lavranos & T.A.McCoy – N. Madagascar
 Aloe rosea (H.Perrier) L.E.Newton & G.D.Rowley – N. Central Madagascar
 Aloe rouxii van Jaarsv. – Mpumalanga
 Aloe rubrodonta T.A.McCoy & Lavranos – N.W. Somalia
 Aloe rubroviolacea Schweinf. – S.W. Arabian Peninsula
 Aloe rugosifolia M.G.Gilbert & Sebsebe – S. Ethiopia to N. Kenya
 Aloe rugosquamosa (H.Perrier) J.-B.Castillon & J.-P.Castillon – Central Madagascar
 Aloe rulkensii T.A.McCoy & O.J.Baptista – Mozambique
 Aloe rupestris Baker – S. Mozambique to KwaZulu-Natal
 Aloe rupicola Reynolds – Angola (Bié)
 Aloe ruspoliana Baker – S. & E. Ethiopia to Kenya
 Aloe ruvuensis T.A.McCoy & Lavranos – N. Tanzania

S

 Aloe sakarahensis Lavranos & M.Teissier – Madagascar
 Aloe sanguinalis Awale & Barkworth - N. Somalia
 Aloe saudiarabica T.A.McCoy – S.W. Saudi Arabia
 Aloe saundersiae (Reynolds) Reynolds – KwaZulu-Natal
 Aloe scabrifolia L.E.Newton & Lavranos – Kenya
 Aloe schelpei Reynolds – Central Ethiopia
 Aloe schilliana L.E.Newton & G.D.Rowley – N. Madagascar
 Aloe ×  schimperi Tod. – Cape Province
 Aloe schoelleri Schweinf. – W. Eritrea
 Aloe schomeri Rauh – S.E. Madagascar
 Aloe schweinfurthii Baker – Mali to South Sudan
 Aloe scobinifolia Reynolds & P.R.O.Bally – N. Somalia
 Aloe scorpioides L.C.Leach – S.W. Angola
 Aloe secundiflora Engl. – S. Ethiopia to Tanzania
 Aloe seibanica Orlando & El Azzouni – South Yemen
 Aloe seretii De Wild. – E. DR Congo
 Aloe serriyensis Lavranos – S. Yemen (Jebel Arays)
 Aloe shadensis Lavranos & Collen. – S.W. Saudi Arabia (Jabal Shada)
 Aloe sharoniae N.R.Crouch & Gideon F.Sm. – Swaziland to N. & Central KwaZulu-Natal
 Aloe sheilae Lavranos – W. Saudi Arabia
 Aloe silicicola H.Perrier – Central Madagascar
 Aloe simii Pole-Evans – Mpumalanga
 Aloe sinana Reynolds – Central Ethiopia
 Aloe sinkatana Reynolds – N.E. Sudan
 Aloe sobolifera (S.Carter) Wabuyele – Tanzania
 Aloe socialis (H.Perrier) L.E.Newton & G.D.Rowley – W. Madagascar
 Aloe somaliensis C.H.Wright ex W.Watson – Djibouti to N. Somalia
 Aloe soutpansbergensis I.Verd. – Limpopo
 Aloe speciosa Baker – S. Cape Province
 Aloe spectabilis Reynolds – KwaZulu-Natal
 Aloe spicata L.f. – S.E. Zimbabwe to S. Africa
 Aloe spinitriaggregata J.-B.Castillon – Madagascar
 Aloe springatei-neumannii L.E.Newton – Kenya
 Aloe squarrosa Baker ex Balf.f. – W. Socotra
 Aloe steudneri Schweinf. – Eritrea to N.W. Ethiopia
 Aloe striata Haw. – Cape Province
 Aloe suarezensis H.Perrier – N. Madagascar
 Aloe subacutissima G.D.Rowley – S. Central Madagascar
 Aloe subspicata (Baker) Boatwr. & J.C.Manning – S. Africa
 Aloe succotrina Weston – S.W. Cape Province
 Aloe suffulta Reynolds – S. Malawi to N.E. KwaZulu-Natal
 Aloe suprafoliata Pole-Evans – Mpumalanga to N. KwaZulu-Natal
 Aloe suzannae Decary – S. Madagascar
 Aloe swynnertonii Rendle – E. Zimbabwe to W. Mozambique

T

 Aloe tartarensis T.A.McCoy & Lavranos – Kenya (Tartar Falls)
 Aloe tauri L.C.Leach – S. Zimbabwe
 Aloe tegetiformis L.E.Newton – Kenya
 Aloe teissieri Lavranos – S.E. Madagascar
 Aloe tewoldei M.G.Gilbert & Sebsebe – E. Central Ethiopia
 Aloe thompsoniae Groenew. – Limpopo
 Aloe thorncroftii Pole-Evans – Mpumalanga
 Aloe thraskii Baker – S.E. Cape Province to KwaZulu-Natal
 Aloe tomentosa Deflers – N. Yemen
 Aloe tormentorii (Marais) L.E.Newton & G.D.Rowley – N. Mauritius (incl. î. Ronde)
 Aloe tororoana Reynolds – S.E. Uganda
 Aloe torrei I.Verd. & Christian – Mozambique (Namuli Mts.)
 Aloe trachyticola (H.Perrier) Reynolds – Central Madagascar
 Aloe transvaalensis Kuntze – Botswana to Northern Province
 Aloe trichosantha A.Berger – Eritrea to Somalia
 Aloe trigonantha L.C.Leach – N.W. Ethiopia
Aloe trinervis  – Great Indian Desert
Aloe trothae A.Berger – Tanzania (Kigoma Distr.)
 Aloe tsitongambarikana J.-P.Castillon & J.-B.Castillon – Madagascar
 Aloe turkanensis Christian – N.E. Uganda to Kenya

U-V

 Aloe ukambensis Reynolds – S.E. Kenya
 Aloe umfoloziensis Reynolds – KwaZulu-Natal
 Aloe vacillans Forssk. – S.W. Arabian Peninsula
 Aloe vallaris L.C.Leach – S.W. Angola (Serra de Chela)
 Aloe vanbalenii Pillans – KwaZulu-Natal to Swaziland
 Aloe vandermerwei Reynolds – Limpopo
 Aloe vanrooyenii Gideon F.Sm. & N.R.Crouch – KwaZulu-Natal
 Aloe vaombe Decorse & Poiss. – S. Madagascar
 Aloe vaotsanda Decary – S. Madagascar
 Aloe venenosa Engl. – N.E. Angola
 Aloe vera (L.) Burm.f. – S.W. Arabian Peninsula
 Aloe verecunda Pole-Evans – Northern Province
 Aloe versicolor Guillaumin – S.E. Madagascar
 Aloe veseyi Reynolds – S.W. Tanzania to N.E. Zambia
 Aloe viguieri H.Perrier – S. Madagascar
 Aloe virginieae J.-P.Castillon – Madagascar
 Aloe viridiflora Reynolds – Namibia
 Aloe vituensis Baker – S.E. South Sudan to N. Kenya
 Aloe vogtsii Reynolds – Limpopo (Soutpansberg)
 Aloe volkensii Engl. – Rwanda to E. Tropical Africa
 Aloe vossii Reynolds – Limpopo (Soutpansberg Mts.)
 Aloe vryheidensis Groenew. – Limpopo to KwaZulu-Natal

W-Z

 Aloe wanalensis T.C.Cole & T.G.Forrest – Uganda
 Aloe welmelensis Sebsebe & Nordal – Ethiopia
 Aloe weloensis Sebsebe – Ethiopia
 Aloe welwitschii Klopper & Gideon F.Sm. – Angola (Huíla Plateau)
 Aloe werneri J.-B.Castillon – S.E. Madagascar
 Aloe whitcombei Lavranos – S. Oman
 Aloe wickensii Pole-Evans – Mpumalanga
 Aloe wildii (Reynolds) Reynolds – S. Tropical Africa (Chimanimani Mts.)
 Aloe wilsonii Reynolds – N. Uganda to N.W. Kenya
 Aloe wollastonii Rendle – E. Central Tropical Africa
 Aloe woodii Lavranos & Collen. – W. Saudi Arabia to Yemen
 Aloe wrefordii Reynolds – S.E. South Sudan to N.W. Kenya
 Aloe yavellana Reynolds – S.W. Ethiopia
 Aloe yemenica J.R.I.Wood – S.W. Arabian Peninsula
 Aloe zebrina Baker – S. Tropical Africa to Namibia
 Aloe zubb T.A.McCoy & Lavranos – South Sudan

References

Aloe
Aloe species